John Farquharson (1699–1782), was a Scottish Jesuit.

Farquharson was born in the valley of Braemar, Aberdeenshire, on 19 April 1699, entered the Society of Jesus at Tournai. He completed his theology at the Scotch College, Douay, in 1729, and in October that year landed at Edinburgh to serve the mission. He was stationed at Strathglass, Inverness-shire, where he acquired a thorough knowledge of the Gaelic language. On 2 Feb. 1735–6 he made profession of the four vows. About 1745 he was taken prisoner while celebrating mass, and conveyed to Edinburgh in his sacerdotal vestments. After enduring many sufferings he was restored to liberty. Subsequently to the suppression of his order he lived principally in the valley of Braemar, where he died on 13 October 1782.

He formed an immense collection of Gaelic poetry. The original folio manuscript in his own handwriting he deposited in 1772 in the Scotch College at Douay. Instead, however, of its being carefully preserved, it was suffered to be thrown aside and to perish. The whole of the poems of Ossian were in this collection, and other compositions not known to Macpherson, or, at least, not published by him.

References

1699 births
1782 deaths
17th-century Scottish people
18th-century Scottish people
18th-century Roman Catholics
Scottish Jesuits
People from Marr
18th-century Jesuits